A feudal earldom is a Scottish feudal title that is held en baroneum, which means that its holder, who is called a feudal earl, is also always a feudal baron.  A feudal earldom is an ancient title of nobility in Scotland. The holder may or may not be a Lord of Regality, which meant that the holder was appointed by the Crown and had the power of "pit and gallows", meaning the power to authorise the death sentence. A feudal earl ranks above a feudal lord and a feudal baron (being a feudal baron of a higher degree), but below an earldom which is a title in the Peerage of Scotland. Feudal earldoms are very rare. As well, due to rights granted from ancient Scots law, in a very few instances, the holder of a feudal earldom may be different than the holder of a peerage title of the same name.  A peer is invariably addressed as 'Lord Placename' or 'Lord Such-and-so', whilst those holding a feudal earldom are addressed 'Earl of Placename'. Scottish titles, in order of precedence, are as follows: Duke, Marquis, Earl, Viscount, Lord, Baronet, Knight, feudal Baron, Clan Chief, Esquire/Gentleman. Wallace states that "Lordships, Earldoms, Marquisates and Dukedoms differ only in name from Baronies" but continues "one whose property was erected into a Lordship ranked before a simple Baron" and "A person to whom an Earldom belonged, would be superior to a person who had no more than a lordship ... One, whose lands were incorporated into a Marquisate, was superior to both ... A man, who owned a fief elevated into a Dukedom, was exulted above all three." However, Lord Stair states that Lordships or Earldoms are "but more noble titles of a Barony".

Modern status
In 2014 the Lord Lyon King of Arms issued the "Note on the Petition of George Menking", under which he determined to accept petitions for the grant arms for feudal dignities including Earldoms since such dignities have historically always been of the genus of a barony and as such represent a higher form of barony and fall within the jurisdiction of the King of Arms.

The Menking Note is considered an important change (and return to similar status of an earlier Lord Lyon) from an interim ruling on the petition in 2010 by a Swiss national Willi Ernst Sturzenegger, who had purchased the feudal Earldom of Arran, and wished to be titled as " 'Sturzenegger of Arran, holder of the territorial Earldom of Arran", or  'Sturzenegger of Arran, holder of the feudal Earldom of Arran'. In 2006, an earlier Lord Lyon had recognised three petitioners as "Feudal Countess of Crawfurd-Lindsay", "Feudal Earl of Breadalbane" and "Feudal Earl of Rothes". In the ruling in 2010, the Lord Lyon stated that as a general rule previous decisions should be followed, but he could not agree with them as the arguments in the previous cases did not appear to have been tested and no reasoning had been given by the prior Lord Lyon for his decisions. The title "feudal Earl", "territorial Earl", or simply "Earl", being used or recognised in respect of an assemblage of lands into an earldom had never existed until recently. He stated that while the Abolition of Feudal Tenure Act of 2000 divorced feudal baronies from land title, it preserved the title of baron. This was not the case he found with "territorial" or "feudal earldoms": "On the contrary there is a clear break between the type of territorial earldoms which existed before the evolution of a personal peerage, and the later erection of lands into what has been termed a “territorial earldom”. I therefore do not accept that it follows from the recognition of a feudal baron, or one possessed of the dignity of a former feudal barony, as “Baron of X”, that the person in possession of a “territorial earldom” stemming from the erection by the Crown of lands into a free earldom, should be recognised as an “Earl” or “Countess”, “feudal” or otherwise."

Under the 2014 Menking Note, the Lord Lyon effectively revoked the 2010 restrictions on recognition of such dignities and customary title as long provided to those properly holding them.

See also
See also Peerage of Scotland and List of feudal baronies.

List of Feudal Earldoms (created before 1707)
Below is an incomplete list of Scottish feudal earldoms created in Scotland before 1707.

a: The creation date is the earliest known date for the Earldom and subject to revision

Notes

References

 Register of the Great Seal of Scotland; 
 Abolition of Feudal Tenure Act, Scotland; 
 Statutes of 1592; 
 Baronetcy Warrants of Charles I.

Earldoms in the Peerage of Scotland
Earldom